Vasa is a masculine given name and nickname (short for Vasilije), as well as a surname. Notable people with the name include:

 Vasa Mihich (born 1933), American artist
 Vasa Mijić (born 1973), Serbian volleyball player
 Vasa Stajić (1878—1947), Serbian writer and philosopher
 Vasilije Vasa Čarapić (1768–1806), Serbian voivode (military commander)
 Vasilije Vasa Jovanović (1874–1970), Serbian lawyer, politician, founder of the Chetnik movement and a founding member of the League of Nations
 Vasilije Vasa Živković (1819–1891), Serbian poet and Orthodox priest
 Vasilije Vasa Pelagić (1833–1899), Bosnian Serb writer, physician, educator, clergyman, nationalist and proponent of utopian socialism
 Vasilije Vaso Čubrilović (Vasilije Vasa Čubrilović; 1897–1990), Bosnian Serb scholar and politician
 Eero Vasa (born 1997), Finnish tennis player
 Robert F. Vasa (born 1951), American Roman Catholic prelate and former Bishop of Baker

See also 
 Váša Příhoda (1900–1960), Czech violinist

Nicknames
Hypocorisms
Serbian masculine given names